Oristelle Marx (born 7 July 1971) is a former French wheelchair tennis player, she is a right-handed player. She competed in two Paralympic Games and won two bronze medals in the doubles' events with Arlette Racineux.

In 1986, Marx was involved in an accident in a gymnastics training centre which resulted in her paraplegia. She now works as a consultant trainer for disability awareness.

References

1971 births
Living people
Sportspeople from Toulouse
French female tennis players
Wheelchair tennis players at the 1992 Summer Paralympics
Wheelchair tennis players at the 1996 Summer Paralympics
Medalists at the 1992 Summer Paralympics
Medalists at the 1996 Summer Paralympics
Paralympic medalists in wheelchair tennis
Paralympic bronze medalists for France
Paralympic wheelchair tennis players of France
People with paraplegia
20th-century French people